Mattia Cola (born in Sondalo on ) is an Italian biathlete.

Cola competed in the 2010 Winter Olympics for Italy. His best performance was 12th, as part of the Italian relay team. His best individual performance was 55th, in the pursuit. He also finished 60th in the sprint.

As of February 2013, his best performance at the Biathlon World Championships, is 11th, as part of the 2008 Italian men's relay team. His best individual performance is 78th, in the 2008 individual.

As of February 2013, his best Biathlon World Cup finish is 5th, as part of the Italian men's relay team in two races during the 2007/08 season. His best individual finish is 26th, in the pursuit at Antholz in 2009/10. His best overall finish in the Biathlon World Cup is 90th, in 2007/08.

References 

1984 births
Biathletes at the 2010 Winter Olympics
Italian male biathletes
Living people
Olympic biathletes of Italy
People from Sondalo
Sportspeople from the Province of Sondrio